Acanthothecis rimosa is a species of corticolous (bark-dwelling) lichen in the family Graphidaceae. Found in Brazil, it was formally described as a new species in 2022 by André Aptroot, Robert Lücking, and Marcela Eugenia da Silva Cáceres. The lichen has a smooth and somewhat shiny, mineral-grey thallus lacking a cortex, and also lacking a surrounding prothallus. The asci contain two spores. The ascospores are hyaline, ellipsoid, and measure 45–53 by 13–16 μm; they have 15–19 transverse and 3–4 longitudinal septa. Stictic acid, a lichen product, is found in the lichen and is detectable using thin-layer chromatography.

References

rimosa
Lichen species
Lichens described in 2022
Lichens of Northeast Brazil
Taxa named by André Aptroot
Taxa named by Robert Lücking
Taxa named by Marcela Cáceres